Henry Maske (born 6 January 1964) is a German former professional boxer and one of Germany's most popular sports figures. He held the IBF light heavyweight title from 1993 until 1996.

Amateur career

Maske was born in Treuenbrietzen, Bezirk Potsdam. He was an Olympic Gold medallist 1988 in Seoul (middleweight) for East Germany. His results were:

Olympic results
Below is the record of Henry Maske, an East German middleweight boxer who competed at the 1988 Seoul Olympics:

Round of 64: bye
Round of 32: Defeated Helman Palije (Malawi) by decision, 5–0
Round of 16: Defeated Sello Mojela (Lesotho) by walkover
Quarterfinal: Defeated Michele Mastrodonato (Italy) by decision, 5–0
Semifinal: Defeated Chris Sande (Kenya) by decision, 5–0
Final: Defeated Egerton Marcus (Canada) by decision, 5–0 (won gold medal)

Maske won the 1989 World Amateur Boxing Championships in Moscow and the silver medal at the 1986 World Amateur Boxing Championships in Reno, Nevada. His toughest opponents were Cubans, particularly Angel Espinosa, whom he met three times in 1987–1988, losing all three by a 0–5 unanimous decision, and luckily for him, Maske didn't met Espinosa at Seoul as Cuba boycotted the 1988 Olympics.

Professional career
During his career, Maske was a five-time boxing champion of East Germany. After reunification in 1990, he turned professional, and became the IBF world title holder in the light heavyweight category on 20 March 1993. Maske defended his title ten times between 1993 and 1996.

He retired in 1996 after suffering a split decision loss at the hands of Virgil Hill. In 2007, he won in a rematch.

Post-boxing life

As of 2010, Maske owns ten McDonald's franchises in Germany. Maske works as a boxing commentator for the first German television channel (ARD).

Comeback
After an 11-year retirement, he avenged his only defeat as a professional against Virgil Hill. The fight was held on 31 March 2007, in Munich; Maske won by unanimous decision after 12 rounds.

Professional boxing record

Television viewership

Germany

Acting
Maske played the lead role in the 2010 biopic Max Schmeling, for which he took several months of acting lessons. However, critique were largely negative on his performance in the film.

References

External links
 Official webpage; accessed 1 January 2016.
 
 Profile, Leverkusen.com

1964 births
Living people
People from Treuenbrietzen
People from Bezirk Potsdam
German male boxers
Sportspeople from Brandenburg
Light-heavyweight boxers
German male film actors
National People's Army military athletes
Olympic boxers of East Germany
Boxers at the 1988 Summer Olympics
Olympic medalists in boxing
Olympic gold medalists for East Germany
Medalists at the 1988 Summer Olympics
AIBA World Boxing Championships medalists
World light-heavyweight boxing champions
International Boxing Federation champions
Recipients of the Patriotic Order of Merit in gold
Recipients of the Cross of the Order of Merit of the Federal Republic of Germany
Members of the Order of Merit of North Rhine-Westphalia